The Qatari passport is a passport document issued to citizens of Qatar for international travel.

Visa requirements

As of 1 October 2019, Qatari citizens had visa-free or visa on arrival access to 92 countries and territories, ranking the Qatari passport 57th in the world according to the Visa Restrictions Index. 
As citizens of a GCC member country, citizens of Qatar are permitted free movement within the GCC member states, in a manner similar to that of the European Union.

See also 
 Visa policy of Qatar
 Qatari nationality law

References

Qatar
Government of Qatar